The adópengő (in English: "tax pengő") was a temporary unit of currency of Hungary between 1 January 1946, when it was introduced to try to stabilise the pengő, and 31 July 1946, when both were replaced by the forint. Initially, the adópengő was only an accounting unit used by the government and commercial banks; later, bonds and savings certificates denominated in adópengő were also issued for the public and replaced pengő notes in circulation.

Statistics

References

Modern obsolete currencies
1946 establishments in Hungary
1946 disestablishments in Hungary
1940s economic history
Currencies of Hungary